Ghayab Aya is an Indian animated television series. The series, made in 10 parts, was first shown on the National television network Doordarshan in 1990. The story revolved around the adventures of Ghayab the friendly always do- gooder 'Casper type' naughty ghost.

Ghayab Aya was directed by Ashok Talwar and animated by Suddhasattwa Basu, who first started his career in 1981 as a designer and an illustrator for the TARGET children's magazine.

References

1980s Indian television series
1986 Indian television series debuts
1986 Indian television series endings
Indian children's animated fantasy television series
DD National original programming
Ghosts in television